It's Kind of a Funny Story is a 2010 American comedy-drama film written and directed by Anna Boden and Ryan Fleck, an adaptation of Ned Vizzini's 2006 novel of the same name. The film stars Keir Gilchrist, Zach Galifianakis, Emma Roberts, and Viola Davis. It was released in the United States on October 8, 2010, and received generally positive reviews.

Plot
Contemplating suicide, depressed Craig Gilner seeks help at a hospital. He tells a doctor named Dr. Mahmoud that he needs immediate help, so he is registered for five days at the hospital's psychiatric floor.

Craig feels a lot of pressure from his high school, Executive Pre-Professional, and is stressed over needing to turn in an application for a prestigious summer school. Also he feels he has shortcomings in the shadow of his best friend Aaron, who is great at everything, and his dad, who pressures him to do well. At first, Craig is uncertain if he made the right choice to stay, fearing his friends may find out where he is, especially Nia, his crush and Aaron's girlfriend.

Craig is introduced to Bobby, a patient who takes Craig under his wing. During a group discussion, Craig learns that Bobby is stressed about an upcoming interview, hoping to move to a group home. Bobby worries that the sweater he is wearing is all he has to wear for the interview, so Craig offers him one of his dad's dress shirts to wear. Noelle, another patient who is in for self-harm, is impressed by Craig's kindness, so leaves him a note to meet with her later on. They attend a painting session for patients together, where Craig paints a picture of an imaginary city map which he describes as "like my own brain".

Throughout his stay, Craig bonds with various patients, including Bobby and Noelle. Bobby tells him he is a father of a little girl, and is in the ward for attempting to kill himself six times. As Craig tries to help Bobby with his problems, Bobby, in turn, helps Craig gain the courage to ask out Noelle.

One night, Nia stops by to visit Craig, revealing that she and Aaron have broken up. Craig invites Nia to his room, where she tries to seduce him. However, they are interrupted by Craig's roommate Muqtada, a patient who has not left the room during his stay. As Nia runs out, Craig chases her, declaring he loves her, unaware that Noelle is standing behind him. Upset, she storms off, leaving behind a self-portrait she had planned to give him.

Craig eventually wins Noelle's forgiveness, and the pair briefly sneak out of the ward, onto the hospital roof. There, Noelle asks him out, and they kiss. Craig has an interview with the head physician, Dr. Minerva; he explains that he has realized that he wants to become an artist, and is thankful his problems aren't as bad as some of the others, who are in jail for example.

That night, Craig asks the staff for a pizza party, so the patients can say goodbye to him and Bobby—both are being discharged the following day. Craig calls Aaron, asking him to bring a record. When Aaron arrives, he tells him that he and Nia are working out their problems and they hug. At the party, Craig plays the record of Egyptian music, bringing Muqtada out of his room. He tells Bobby they should meet again after they are discharged, which he considers, and Bobby thanks him for changing his future outlook.

After Craig is discharged, he narrates a montage showing he has started dating Noelle, become better friends with Aaron and Nia, and begun pursuing his goal to become an artist. He has broken the news to his dad that he is not going to follow his path, which his dad understands. Craig affirms that, while his stay didn't cure his condition, it helped him a lot, and he can get through the rest of his life with the help of his family and friends.

Cast

Production

In May 2006, Paramount Pictures and MTV Films acquired the film rights to the novel. Anna Boden and Ryan Fleck were hired to adapt the screenplay. The film was later placed in turnaround and bought by Focus Features.

Production began in New York City on November 30, 2009. Principal photography took about six weeks, ending on February 2, 2010. Scenes taking place in the fictional Executive Pre-Professional High School were shot at Poly Prep Country Day School in Brooklyn, while Woodhull Medical Center in Brooklyn stood in for Argenon Hospital.

As of May 13, 2010, the film completed editing. Canadian indie rock band Broken Social Scene worked on the score for the film.

Release
The film was originally scheduled for a limited release in the United States on September 24, 2010. Focus Features later opted for a wide release of approximately 500 theaters across the US and a release date of October 8, 2010. The film premiered at the 2010 Toronto International Film Festival.

To coincide with the film's release, Hyperion Books published a new edition of the novel, featuring photos from the film on the cover.

The film aired on HBO cable in the summer of 2011.

Critical response
On Rotten Tomatoes, the film holds a 58% approval rating based on 138 reviews with an average rating of 6/10. The critics consensus states "It's amiable, and it does a surprisingly good job of sidestepping psych ward comedy clichés, but given its talented cast and directors, It's Kind of a Funny Story should be more than just mildly entertaining." On Metacritic, the film has an weighted average score of 63, based on 33 reviews, which indicates "Generally favorable reviews".

Justin Chang of Variety wrote: "The filmmakers fully retain their offbeat sensibility and attentiveness to character while providing perhaps the sharpest showcase yet for Zach Galifianakis' outsized talents."
Peter Travers of Rolling Stone wrote: "I don't blame you for backing off a movie that focuses on a suicidal teen who learns warm life lessons by spending five days in a Brooklyn hospital's psych ward. Stop worrying. It's Kind of a Funny Story, based on Ned Vizzini's semiautobiographical novel, breaks the jinx."

Michael Rechtshaffen of The Hollywood Reporter called it "A dramatically inert, lethargic dramedy that isn't nearly as quirky and poignant as it perceives itself." Ann Hornaday of The Washington Post gave the film a negative review, saying "There's very little that's even kind of funny in It's Kind of a Funny Story, which can't accurately be described as a comedy but isn't a true drama, either."

Home media
It's Kind of a Funny Story was released on DVD and Blu-ray Disc on February 8, 2011.

References

External links
 
 
 

2010 films
2010 romantic comedy-drama films
2010s teen comedy-drama films
2010s teen romance films
American romantic comedy-drama films
American teen comedy-drama films
American teen romance films
Films about suicide
Films based on American novels
Films based on young adult literature
Films directed by Anna Boden
Films directed by Ryan Fleck
Films set in Brooklyn
Films set in psychiatric hospitals
Films shot in New York City
Focus Features films
Films about self-harm
Films about depression
2010s English-language films
2010s American films